Nové Zámky is a town in Nové Zámky District in the Nitra Region of southwestern Slovakia.

Geography
The town is located on the Danubian Lowland, on the Nitra River, at an altitude of 119 metres. It is located around 100 km from Bratislava and around 25 km from the Hungarian border. It is a road and railway hub of southern Slovakia.

The town lies in the temperate zone and has a continental climate. Average annual precipitation is 556 mm.

History

The town has a distinguished history. From the second half of the 10th century until 1918, it was part of the Kingdom of Hungary. A fortress was built as a defence against the Ottoman Empire, on the site of an older settlement in the years 1573–81.  Between 1589 and 1663, the settlement was the seat of the Captaincy of Lower Hungary. The town developed around the fortress. The huge new fortress was one of the most modern in Europe when it was built, a prime example of the star fortress which was considered to be adapted to the advance in artillery in the preceding centuries. (In fact, the Hungarian name means "the archbishop's new castle".)

The Ottomans failed to conquer it six times (except Ottoman rule between 1566–1595 and 1605–1606), but in 1663 they managed to do so. It was made the center of an Ottoman eyalet in present-day southern Slovakia – with the subordinate sanjaks of Litra, Leve, Novigrad, Holok, Bukabak and Şefradi (probably Šahy).

The saying "Strong as an Ottoman in front of Nové Zámky", which means working with determination and stability, reflects the memory of conquest determination of the Ottomans.

In 1685 it was conquered by the imperial troops of Charles V, Duke of Lorraine. Six years later, it received town privileges from the Esztergom archbishop.

The town also played an important role in many anti-Habsburg uprisings in the northern parts of Royal Hungary in the 17th century. Emperor Charles VI had it razed in 1724–1725, to prevent potential further insurrections which would use the fortress as their base.

After the break-up of Austria-Hungary in 1918/1920, the town became part of the newly created Czechoslovakia. As a result of the First Vienna Award, it was occupied by Hungary between 1938 and 1945.

After the Germans occupied Hungary in March 1944, the deportation of Hungarian Jewry to Auschwitz began. The town’s Jews were concentrated in a temporary ghetto. On June 12 and 15, 1944, two transports of Jews were sent to the Auschwitz concentration camp. The entire local Jewry was deported; few survived.

During World War II (1944), the town was heavily damaged by bombings of the Allies. Only small parts of the fortress are still standing today. It is, however, still depicted on the city's coat of arms.

Culture

Museums
The Ernest Zmeták Art Gallery on Björnsonova Street has two permanent exhibitions. The first one, called "European Art of the 16th to 20th Century″is based on the donation of a local painter and collector, Ernest Zmeták. The second one presents the works of art of a local Hungarian avant-garde artist and writer, Lajos Kassák.

Synagogue
The orthodox synagogue is located at Česká bašta and dates from 1880. After reconstruction in 1992 it was registered as a historic landmark of Slovakia. It is one of only four synagogues in Slovakia (in Bratislava, Košice, Bardejov and Nové Zámky) that are used for religious purposes by the local Jewish community.

Franciscan church and monastery
see Franciscan church and monastery, Nové Zámky

The Franciscan church and monastery was built in the early baroque style in the middle of the 17th century. The complex was renovated in the 18th and at the end of the 19th century.

Demographics
The 2001 census recorded a population of 42,262 people, with 69.67% of them being Slovaks, 27.52% Hungarians and others. The most widespread religion was Roman Catholicism (71.72%), followed by a group without denomination (17.75%) and Evangelics (Lutherans) (3.36%).

Notable people
Lucien Aigner – photographer
Etienne Aigner – fashion designer
Anton Bernolák – linguist
Ayrton Cable – social activist
Ferenc Helbing – graphic artist
Mary Katherine Horony – noted Old West figure, partner of Dr. John H. "Doc" Holliday, present at the Gunfight at the O.K. Corral in Tombstone, AZ, USA
Lajos Kassák – writer, critic, poet, publisher
Ernest Klein - linguist, author, and rabbi
Samuel Klein - rabbi, historian, and historical geographer in Mandatory Palestine. 
Henrieta Nagyová – tennis player
Peter Ölvecký – professional ice hockey player
Ladislav Pataki – sports scientist, athletics coach, masters athletics champion
György Pray – Jesuit Abbot, canon, librarian, historian
Miriam Roth – Israeli pioneer of preschool education, author and scholar of children's literature
Martina Suchá – tennis player
Yaakov Weiss -  member of the Irgun in Mandatory Palestine

Twin towns – sister cities

Nové Zámky is twinned with:

 Fonyód, Hungary
 Sevnica, Slovenia
 Tábor, Czech Republic
 Znojmo, Czech Republic

See also
Nové Zámky Roman Catholic Church
Stadium in Nové Zámky

References

External links
Official website
Map of Nové Zámky
Nové Zámky Fotoalbum

Cities and towns in Slovakia
Villages and municipalities in Nové Zámky District
Populated places established in 1573
Hungarian communities in Slovakia